Digitaria ciliaris is a species of grass known by the common names southern crabgrass, tropical finger-grass, tropical crabgrass or summer grass.

The grass is known as "ගුරු තණ - guru thana" in Sri Lanka.

Distribution
Digitaria ciliaris is a tough plant, believed to have originated in Asia but now found all over the tropical belt of the planet, as well as in many temperate regions of both hemispheres. This grass is an invasive species considered an aggressive weed in certain countries, including China, Mexico and the United States.
  
Together with Portulaca oleracea, Ipomoea pes-caprae and Melanthera biflora, Digitaria ciliaris is usually one of the first species colonizing degraded or altered environments in tropical zones of the planet.

Description
This grass is an annual plant that can grow up to 1 m tall, but is usually much shorter. The roots are at the nodes and the stems produce runners that allow the plant to grow fast forming scruffy-looking patches about 1 m across and half a metre in height. The leaves are linear to linear-ovate narrowing at the tip to 15 centimeters long. The inflorescence is at the top of a long stem, usually much taller than the leaves, with two to nine  5–10 cm long sub-digitate racemes.

Forage Crop
Southern crabgrass, especially the cultivars Red River Crabgrass, 'Impact', and 'Quick-n-Big', have been utilized as a forage crop for livestock, as it is a highly nutritious warm season grass. Red river crabgrass responds well to nitrogen fertilizer, growing around 6 inches tall, and needs to be in rotation with cool-season forage.

References

External links

Southern  crabgrass PFAF

ciliaris
Grasses of Asia
Grasses of India
Flora of Sri Lanka
Flora of Malta